Pablo Andújar successfully defended his title, beating Albert Ramos 6–1, 7–6(7–5) in an all-Spanish final.

Seeds
The top four seeds receive a bye into the second round.

Draw

Finals

Top half

Bottom half

Qualifying

Seeds

Qualifiers

Draw

First qualifier

Second qualifier

Third qualifier

Fourth qualifier

References
 Main Draw
 Qualifying Draw

Grand Prix Hassan II - Singles
2012 Grand Prix Hassan II